DSML may refer to:
Directory Service Markup Language
Domain-Specific Modeling Language